The Divine Move is a 2014 South Korean action film directed by Jo Bum-gu. It stars Jung Woo-sung as a former baduk player, and revolves around his quest for revenge.

The title refers to a particularly brilliant move, considered to be a "once in a lifetime" experience for only the best professionals,  in the board game baduk (called Go in the West) which often turns what was a losing or close game into a winning effort at the most crucial moment.

A prequel spin-off, The Divine Move 2: The Wrathful, was released on November 7, 2019.

Plot
Professional baduk player Tae-seok loses a high-stakes game to infamous underground gambler Sal-soo, and ends up framed for the murder of his own brother and locked up in prison. He vows revenge and trains ferociously. After serving his seven-year sentence, he gets in touch with his brother's former associate "Tricks," hermit and blind master player "The Lord," and skillful junkyard owner Mok-su, "the Carpenter"; together, they begin formulating a plan to get back at Sal-soo and his men. Tae-seok slowly penetrates Sal-soo's inner circle and his gambling joint, and eliminates Sal-soo's men one by one. But Sal-soo discovers Tae-seok's true identity and engages him in one final game that will seal the fates of the two men involved.

Cast

Jung Woo-sung as Tae-seok
Lee Beom-soo as Sal-soo
Ahn Sung-ki as Joo-nim ("The Lord")
Kim In-kwon as Kkong-soo ("Tricks")
Lee Si-young as Bae-kkob ("Belly button")
Ahn Gil-kang as Carpenter Heo 
Lee Do-kyeong as Master Wang
Choi Jin-hyuk as Seon-soo ("Player")
Jung Hae-kyun as Adari
Ahn Seo-hyun as Ryang-ryang
Kim Myung-soo as Tae-seok's older brother
Hwang Choon-ha as Hunchbacked minion
Lee Il-seop as Master Noh
Kim Se-dong as Master Lee 
Kim Joo-myeong as Chinese top 
Lee Yong-nyeo as "Open tail"
Yoo Soon-cheol as 70-year-old boss 
Hong Seong-deok as Professional cutter 
Park Ji-hoon as Acting general 
Yoon Hee-cheol as Elderly senior 
Kim So-jin as Young-sook 
Yoo Jae-sang as Tae-seok's nephew
Choi Il-hwa as Mob leader 
Kim Hong-pa as Warden
Kwon Tae-won as Soft touch president 
Bae Seong-woo as Mahjong man

Box office
Since opening in South Korea on July 3, 2014, the film has grossed  on 3.5 million admissions.

International release
The Divine Move received a limited theatrical release in the United States on July 25, 2014. It was screened in seven major cities in Germany from August 27 to September 21, 2014 as part of the local Fantasy Filmfest's lineup.

Awards and nominations

References

External links

2014 films
2014 crime action films
2014 martial arts films
South Korean crime action films
South Korean martial arts films
South Korean neo-noir films
Go films
South Korean films about revenge
Films about board games
Showbox films
2010s South Korean films